ARA Bahía Agradable (A-23) is an icebreaker and survey ship in service in the Argentine Navy. She has a reinforced hull in order to operate in waters around Antarctica.

References

Auxiliary ships of the Argentine Navy
1990 ships
Ships built in Szczecin